Zoran Vorotović (born 12 August 1958) is a former Montenegrin football player who played left-back for clubs in the former Yugoslavia and Turkey.

Club career
Born in Herceg Novi, SR Montenegro, SFR Yugoslavia, Vorotović began playing football for local side FK Sutjeska Nikšić.  Later, he would play in the Yugoslav First League for FK Budućnost Titograd and FK Spartak Subotica.

In 1987, he moved to Turkey where he would make 68 Süper Lig appearances in a three-year spell with Sarıyer G.K.

Personal life
He was seriously injured in a traffic accident in 2001.

References

External links
 EX YU Fudbalska Statistika po godinama
 

1957 births
Living people
People from Herceg Novi
Association football defenders
Yugoslav footballers
FK Sutjeska Nikšić players
FK Budućnost Podgorica players
Red Star Belgrade footballers
Sarıyer S.K. footballers
FK Spartak Subotica players
Yugoslav First League players
Süper Lig players
Yugoslav expatriate footballers
Expatriate footballers in Turkey
Yugoslav expatriate sportspeople in Turkey